CR Belouizdad, an Algerian professional association football club, has gained entry to Confederation of African Football (CAF) competitions on several occasions. They have represented Algeria in the Champions League on four occasions, the Confederation Cup on four occasions and the now-defunct Cup Winners' Cup on two occasions.

History
CR Belouizdad whose team has regularly taken part in Confederation of African Football (CAF) competitions. Qualification for Algerian clubs is determined by a team's performance in its domestic league and cup competitions, CR Belouizdad have regularly qualified for the primary African competition, the African Cup, by winning the Ligue Professionnelle 1. CR Belouizdad have also achieved African qualification via the Algerian Cup and have played in the former African Cup Winners' Cup. the first match was against ASC Jeanne d'Arc and ended in victory for CR Belouizdad 5–3 but in the second leg, CR Belouizdad did not move to Senegal for unknown reasons. As for the biggest win result was in 1996 against Horoya AC 5–2, and biggest loss was in 2001 against ASEC Mimosas 7–0, The best participation was in 1996 in the African Cup Winners' Cup, when the team reached the semi-finals and was eliminated against AC Sodigraf.

After a difficult season that did not end due to the COVID-19 pandemic in Algeria. it was announced that CR Belouizdad had won the league title for the first time in 20 years and returned to participate in the CAF Champions League Qualifying to the group stage was easy by beating Al Nasr and Gor Mahia back and forth. where the draw was placed in a difficult group with Mamelodi Sundowns, TP Mazembe and Al Hilal. Despite the difficult start but in the last two rounds CR Belouizdad managed to win against TP Mazembe and Mamelodi Sundowns to qualify for the quarter-finals. to face Espérance de Tunis and defeat by penalty kicks 3–2.

CAF competitions

2 CR Belcourt withdrew

Non-CAF competitions

Statistics

By season
Information correct as of 23 April 2022.
Key

Pld = Played
W = Games won
D = Games drawn
L = Games lost
F = Goals for
A = Goals against
Grp = Group stage

PR = Preliminary round
R1 = First round
R2 = Second round
SR16 = Second Round of 16
R16 = Round of 16
QF = Quarter-final
SF = Semi-final

Key to colours and symbols:

By competition

In Africa
:

Non-CAF competitions

Statistics by country
Statistics correct as of game against Wydad AC on April 23, 2022

CAF competitions

Non-CAF competitions

African competitions goals
Statistics correct as of game against Djoliba on October 14, 2022

Hat-tricks

Two goals one match

Non-CAF competitions goals

List of All-time appearances
This List of All-time appearances for CR Belouizdad in African competitions contains football players who have played for CR Belouizdad in African football competitions and have managed to accrue 20 or more appearances.

Gold Still playing competitive football in CR Belouizdad.

African and arab opponents by cities

Notes

References

Africa
Algerian football clubs in international competitions